Daniel Neil is the name of:

Dan Neil (American football), offensive lineman for the Denver Broncos
Dan Neil (footballer), English footballer for Sunderland
Dan Neil (journalist), American journalist

See also
Dan Neal, offensive line for the Baltimore Colts and the Chicago Bears
Dan Neal (Big Brother), British reality TV star